Todmorden is a market town and civil parish in the metropolitan borough of Calderdale, West Yorkshire, England.   It contains over 300 listed buildings that are recorded in the National Heritage List for England.  Of these, two are listed at Grade I, the highest of the three grades, eleven are at Grade II*, the middle grade, and the others are at Grade II, the lowest grade.  This list contains the listed buildings in the town centre and those near the main roads leading from the centre, namely Burnley Road to the northwest, Halifax Road to the northeast, and Rochdale Road to the south, as far as its junction with Bacup Road.  The listed buildings in the outer areas are in Listed buildings in Todmorden (outer areas).

Most of the listed buildings in the area are houses and associated structures, cottages, farmhouses and farm buildings.  The Rochdale Canal runs through the area, and the listed buildings associated with this are bridges, locks, and a warehouse.  The Manchester and Leeds Railway also runs through the area, and associated with this are viaducts and bridges.  The other listed buildings include churches, chapels and a vicarage, public houses and hotels, shops and offices, public buildings, a pair of prehistoric standing stones, milestones, boundary stones, a former textile mill, schools, a statue, a model farm, a bandstand, and two war memorials.


Key

Buildings

References

Citations

Sources

Lists of listed buildings in West Yorkshire
listed buildings